Schistura moeiensis is a species of ray-finned fish, a stone loach, in the genus Schistura. It is found in the Mae Nam Noi drainage system, a tributary of the Salween, the Mae Nam Noi forms the border between Thailand and Myanmar. It has been recorded from streams which have a moderate to fast current, in riffles, over beds consisting of gravel to stone.

References

M
Fish described in 1990